Weldon Bertrand Edwards (April 15, 1924 – May 6, 1988) was an American football offensive tackle in the National Football League (NFL) for the Washington Redskins.  He played college football at Texas Christian University and was drafted in the fourteenth round of the 1947 NFL Draft.

External links
 
 

1924 births
1988 deaths
American football offensive tackles
People from Comanche, Texas
TCU Horned Frogs football players
Texas–Arlington Mavericks football players
Washington Redskins players
Wilmington Clippers players